Maracaiba is a genus of skinks.

Species
The following 2 species, listed alphabetically by specific name, are recognized as being valid:

Maracaiba meridensis 
Maracaiba zuliae

Nota bene: A binomial authority in parentheses indicates that the species was originally described in a genus other than Maracaiba.

References

 
Lizard genera
Taxa named by Stephen Blair Hedges
Taxa named by Caitlin E. Conn